At least twelve ships of the French Navy have borne the name Superbe ("Superb"):

Ships named Superbe 
 , a second-rank ship of the line, lead ship of her class.
 , a galley.
 , a galley .
 , an  70-gun ship of the line.
 , a 60-gun ship of the line.
 , a 74-gun ship of the line.
 , a 74-gun (?) ship of the line, formerly a 64-gun East Indiaman, launched on 11 March 1774, built from 1772 on plans by Groignard.
 , a  74-gun ship of the line.
  (1795), a 24-gun corvette.
 , a 74-gun ship of the line, better known as Breslaw.
 , a Téméraire-class 74-gun ship of the line.

See also

Notes and references

Notes

References

Bibliography 
 
 
 

French Navy ship names